Luknovo is a rural locality (a settlement) in Oktyabrskoye Rural Settlement, Vyaznikovsky District, Vladimir Oblast, Russia. The population was 2,434 as of 2010. There are 24 streets.

Geography 
Luknovo is located 15 km southwest of Vyazniki (the district's administrative centre) by road. Starygino is the nearest rural locality.

References 

Rural localities in Vyaznikovsky District
Vyaznikovsky Uyezd